Erica Christi Crawley (born November 22, 1980) is an American politician serving as a member of the Franklin County Board of Commissioners. Crawley previously served as a member of the Ohio House of Representatives from 2019 to 2021.

Career

Ohio House of Representatives
Crawley was elected in the general election on November 6, 2018, winning 82 percent of the vote over 15 percent of Republican candidate Shareeque Arife Sadiq. She was unopposed in the 2020 general election.

Crawley served on the following committees: Armed Services and Veterans Affairs, Finance, Primary and Secondary Education, and the Finance Subcommittee on Primary and Secondary Education.

Franklin County commissioner
Crawley resigned from the Ohio House of Representatives on June 28, 2021 to fill a vacancy on the Franklin County Board of Commissioners. Following the retirement of longtime county commissioner Marilyn Brown, the Franklin County Democratic Party was allowed to choose her replacement. In a 63–54 vote, it chose Crawley, who was sworn in on July 1, 2021

Election history

References

1980 births
Living people
21st-century American politicians
21st-century American women politicians
Capital University Law School alumni
Cleveland State University alumni
Crawley, Erica
Walden University (Minnesota) alumni
Women state legislators in Ohio
African-American state legislators in Ohio
21st-century African-American women
21st-century African-American politicians
20th-century African-American people
20th-century African-American women